A homotrimer is a protein which is composed of three identical units of polypeptide.

Examples
 Hemagglutinin (influenza)
 Spike protein (coronavirus)

See also
 Protein trimer

References

Peptides